Tetracoccus  may refer to:
Tetracoccus (bacterium), a genus of the Rhodobacteraceae
Tetracoccus (plant), a plant genus under the family Picrodendraceae
Tetracoccus, a genus of algae in the family Dictyosphaeriaceae, now called Westella